Crown corporations in Canada are government organizations with a mixture of commercial and public-policy objectives. They are directly and wholly owned by the Crown (i.e. the government of Canada or a province).

Crown corporations represent a specific form of state-owned enterprise. Each corporation is ultimately accountable to (federal or provincial) Parliament through a relevant minister for the conduct of its affairs. They are established by an Act of Parliament and report to that body via the relevant minister in Cabinet, though they are "shielded from constant government intervention and legislative oversight" and thus "generally enjoy greater freedom from direct political control than government departments."

Crown corporations are distinct from "departmental corporations" such as the Canada Revenue Agency.

Crown corporations have a long-standing presence in the country and have been instrumental in its formation. They can provide services required by the public that otherwise would not be economically viable as a private enterprise or that do not fit exactly within the scope of any ministry. They are involved in everything from the distribution, use, and price of certain goods and services to energy development, resource extraction, public transportation, cultural promotion, and property management.

, there were 47 federal Crown corporations in Canada. Provinces and territories operate their own Crown corporations independently of the federal government.

Structure
In Canada, Crown corporations within either the federal or provincial level are owned by the Crown as the institution's sole legal shareholder. This follows the legal premise that the monarch, as the personification of Canada, owns all state property.

Established by an Act of Parliament, each corporation is ultimately accountable to (federal or provincial) Parliament through a relevant minister for the conduct of its affairs.

Although these corporations are owned by the Crown, they are operated with much greater managerial autonomy than government departments. While they report to Parliament via the relevant minister in Cabinet, they are "shielded from constant government intervention and legislative oversight" and thus "generally enjoy greater freedom from direct political control than government departments." Direct control over operations are only exerted over the corporation's budget and the appointment of its senior leadership through Orders-in-Council.

Further, in the federal sphere, certain Crown corporations can be an agent or non-agent of the Crown. One with agent status is entitled to the same constitutional prerogatives, privileges, and immunities held by the Crown and can bind the Crown by its acts. The Crown is thus entirely responsible for the actions of these organisations. The Crown is not liable for Crown corporations with non-agent status, except for actions of that corporation carried out on instruction from the government, though there may be "moral obligations" on the part of the Crown in other circumstances.

Function 
Crown corporations are generally formed to fill a need that the federal or provincial government deems in the national interest or not profitable for private industry. Some Crown corporations are expected to be profitable organisations, while others are non-commercial and rely entirely on public funds to operate.

History

Prior to the formation of Crown corporations as presently understood, much of what later became Canada was settled and governed by a similar type of entity called a chartered company. These companies were established by a royal charter by the Scottish, English, or French crown, but were owned by private investors.  They fulfilled the dual roles of promoting government policy abroad and making a return for shareholders.  Certain companies were mainly trading businesses, but some were given a mandate (by royal charter) to govern a specific territory called a charter colony, and the head of this colony, called a proprietary governor, was both a business manager and the governing authority in the area.  The first colonies on the island of Newfoundland were founded in this manner, between 1610 and 1728.

Canada's most famous and influential chartered company was the Hudson's Bay Company (HBC), founded on May 2, 1670, by royal charter of King Charles II. The HBC became the world's largest land owner, at one point overseeing , territories that today incorporate the provinces of Manitoba, Saskatchewan and Alberta, as well as Nunavut, the Northwest Territories, and Yukon. The HBC were often the point of first contact between the colonial government and First Nations. By the late 19th century, however, the HBC lost its monopoly over Rupert's Land and became a fully privatised company.

The first Crown corporation was the Board of Works, established in 1841 by the Province of Canada to construct shipping canals.

Post-confederation 
The first major Canadian experience with directly state-owned enterprises came during the early growth of the railways. The first Canadian Crown corporation after confederation was the Canadian National Railway Company, created in 1922.

During the earlier part of the century, many British North American colonies that now comprise the Canadian federation had Crown corporations, often in the form of railways, such as the Nova Scotia Railway, since there was limited private capital available for such endeavours. When three British colonies joined to create the Canadian federation in 1867, these railways were transferred to the new central government. As well, the construction of the Intercolonial Railway between them was one of the terms of the new constitution. The first section of this entirely government-owned railway was completed in 1872.

Western Canada's early railways were all run by privately owned companies backed by government subsidies and loans.  By the early twentieth century, however, many of these had become bankrupt. The federal government nationalised several failing Western railways and combined them with its existing Intercolonial and other line in the East to create Canadian National Railways (CNR) in 1918 as a transcontinental system. The CNR was unique in that was a conglomerate, and besides passenger and freight rail, it had inherited major business interests in shipping, hotels, and telegraphy and was able create new lines of business in broadcasting and air travel. Many of the components of this business empire were later spun off into new Crown corporations including some the most important businesses in the mid-20th-century economy of Canada, such Air Canada, the Canadian Broadcasting Corporation (CBC), Via Rail, and Marine Atlantic.

Provincial Crown corporations also re-emerged in the early 20th century, most notably in the selling of alcohol. Government monopoly liquor stores were seen as a compromise between the recently ended era of Prohibition in Canada and the excesses of the previous open market which had led to calls for prohibition in the first place.  Virtually all the provinces used this system at one point. The largest of these government liquor businesses, the Liquor Control Board of Ontario (founded 1927), was by 2008 one of the world's largest alcohol retailers. Resource and utility companies also emerged at this time, notably Ontario Hydro and Alberta Government Telephones in 1906, and SaskTel in 1908. Provincial governments also re-entered the railway business as in Northern Alberta Railways in 1925 and what later became BC Rail in 1918.  A notable anomaly of this era is Canada's only provincially owned "bank" (though not called that for legal reasons) Alberta Treasury Branches, created in 1937.

The Bank of Canada, originally privately owned, became a Crown corporation in 1938. New crown Corporations were also created throughout much of the mid-century.

The federal Post Office Department became a Crown corporation as Canada Post Corporation in 1981, and Canada's export credit agency, Export Development Canada, was created in 1985. Perhaps the most controversial was Petro-Canada, Canada's short-lived attempt to create a national oil company, founded in 1975.

The heyday of Crown corporations ended in the late 1980s, and there has been much privatisation since that time, particularly at the federal level.

Provincial history 
Not only the federal government was involved, but also the provinces, who were in engaged in an era of "province building" (expanding the reach and importance of the provincial governments) around this time. The prototypical example is Hydro-Québec, founded in 1944 and now Canada's largest electricity generator and the world's largest producer of hydro-electricity. It is widely seen as a symbol of modern Quebec, helping to create the Quiet Revolution of the 1960s where French-speakers in Quebec rose to positions of influence in the industrial economy for the first time, and Quebec nationalism emerged as a political force.  This model followed by SaskPower in 1944 and BC Hydro in 1961. Other areas provinces were active in included insurance (Saskatchewan Government Insurance, 1945)

List of federal Crown corporations

List of provincial crown corporations

Alberta
In Alberta, the term public agency is used to describe "boards, commissions, tribunals or other organizations established by government, but not part of a government department."

 Agriculture Financial Services Corporation
 Alberta Capital Finance Authority (ACFA)
 Alberta Gaming, Liquor and Cannabis Commission
 Alberta Indigenous Opportunities Corporation 
 Alberta Investment Management Corporation (AIMCo)
 Alberta Pensions Services Corporation
 Alberta Petroleum Marketing Commission (APMC)
Alberta Innovates (AI)
 Alberta Treasury Branches (ATB Financial)
 Canadian Energy Centre
 Credit Union Deposit Guarantee Corporation (Alberta) (CUDGC)
 Travel Alberta

British Columbia

 BC Assessment Authority
 B.C. Council for International Education
 BC Games Society
 British Columbia Housing Management Commission (BC Housing)
 BC Hydro (formed in 1961) — took over the assets of the British Columbia Electric Railway.
 BC Immigrant Investment Fund
 BC Infrastructure Benefits (BCIB)
 BC Innovation Council (BCIC)
 BC Lottery Corporation
 BC Liquor Distribution Branch
 BC Liquor Stores
 BC Cannabis Stores
 BC Pavilion Corporation — originally created to manage the BC Pavilion during Expo 86, PavCo operates BC Place Stadium and the Vancouver Convention Centre.
 BC Pension Corporation
 BC Transit
 BC Transportation Financing Authority
 British Columbia Investment Management Corporation (bcIMC)
 British Columbia Public School Employers' Association
British Columbia Railway Company
 British Columbia Securities Commission
 Columbia Basin Trust
 Columbia Power Corporation
 Community Living BC
 Community Social Services Employers' Association
 Creston Valley Wildlife Management Area
 Crown Corporations Employers' Association
 Destination BC
 First Peoples' Cultural Council
 Forestry Innovation Investment
 Health Employers Association of British Columbia
 Industry Training Authority
 Insurance Corporation of British Columbia (ICBC; formed in 1973)
 Knowledge Network
 Legal Services Society
 Nechako-Kitamaat Development Fund Society
 Oil and Gas Commission (formed in 1998)
 Organized Crime Agency of British Columbia
 Pacific Carbon Trust
 Partnerships British Columbia Inc.
 Post-secondary Employers' Association of British Columbia
 Private Career Training Institutions Agency
 Ridley Terminals, Inc. — Port of Prince Rupert
 Royal British Columbia Museum (RBCM)
 Transportation Investment Corporation (formed in 2008)

Manitoba
Crown corporations in Manitoba are supported by Manitoba Crown Services.
 Efficiency Manitoba
Manitoba Agricultural Services Corporation
 Manitoba Arts Council
 Combative Sports Commission (formerly Manitoba Boxing Commission) 
 Manitoba Film and Music
 Manitoba Housing and Renewal Corporation
 Manitoba Hydro
 Centra Gas Manitoba
 Manitoba Liquor & Lotteries Corporation 
 Manitoba Public Insurance Corporation

New Brunswick
 Atlantic Lottery Corporation
 Financial and Consumer Services Commission
 NB Power
 New Brunswick Liquor Corporation
 Service New Brunswick
 New Brunswick Community College
 New Brunswick Investment Management Corporation
 WorkSafeNB

Newfoundland and Labrador
 Churchill Falls (Labrador) Corporation Limited
 Heritage Foundation of Newfoundland and Labrador
 Nalcor Energy
 Newfoundland and Labrador Film Development Corporation
 Newfoundland and Labrador Hydro
 Newfoundland and Labrador Housing Corporation
 Newfoundland and Labrador Liquor Corporation
 Research & Development Corporation
 Defence Construction Canada

Nova Scotia
 Art Gallery of Nova Scotia
 Develop Nova Scotia (formerly Waterfront Development Corporation Limited)
 Film and Creative Industries Nova Scotia
 Halifax Convention Centre Corporation (operating as Events East Group)
 Halifax-Dartmouth Bridge Commission
 Harbourside Commercial Park Inc. (HCPI)
 Highway 104 Western Alignment Corporation — created by statute but independent of government
 Innovacorp
 Nova Scotia Arts Council
 Nova Scotia Beef Commission
 Nova Scotia Business Incorporated
 Nova Scotia Crop and Livestock Insurance Commission
 Nova Scotia Farm Loan Board
 Nova Scotia Fisheries & Aquaculture Loan Board
 Nova Scotia Film Development Corporation
 Nova Scotia Gaming Corporation
 Nova Scotia Harness Racing Incorporated
 Nova Scotia Housing Development Corporation
 Nova Scotia Lands Incorporated (NSLI)
 Nova Scotia Liquor Corporation (NSLC)
 Nova Scotia Municipal Finance Corporation (NSMFC)
 Nova Scotia Power Finance Corporation
 Nova Scotia Provincial Housing Agency
 Nova Scotia Resources Limited
 Perennia Food and Agriculture Inc.
 Renova Scotia Bioenergy Inc. (former Bowater Mersey assets)
Rockingham Terminal Inc.
 Sydney Environmental Resources Limited
 Tidal Power Corporation
 Tourism Nova Scotia

Ontario
Crown corporations in Ontario are sometimes referred to as Crown agencies. A Crown agency includes any board, commission, railway, public utility, university, factory, company or agency owned, controlled or operated by the King in Right of Ontario or the Government of Ontario, or under the authority of the Legislature or the Lieutenant Governor-in-Council.
 Agricultural Research Institute of Ontario
 Financial Services Regulatory Authority of Ontario
 GroupeMédia TFO
 Independent Electricity System Operator
 Infrastructure Ontario
 Liquor Control Board of Ontario
 Metrolinx
 Municipal Property Assessment Corporation
 Niagara Escarpment Commission
 Niagara Parks Commission
 Northern Ontario Heritage Fund
 Ontario Agricorp
 Ontario Agency for Health Protection and Promotion
 Ontario Cannabis Retail Corporation
 Ontario Clean Water Agency
 Ontario Educational Communications Authority
 Ontario Lottery and Gaming Corporation
 Ontario Northland Transportation Commission
 Ontario Health
 Ontario Power Generation
 Ontario Science Centre
 Ontario Securities Commission
 Royal Ontario Museum
 Science North
 St. Lawrence Parks Commission
 TRILCOR

Prince Edward Island
 Charlottetown Area Development Corporation
 Innovation PEI
 Island Investment Development Inc.
 P.E.I. Student Financial Assistance Corporation
 Island Waste Management Corporation
 P.E.I. Aquaculture and Fisheries Research Initiative Inc.
 Prince Edward Island Agricultural Insurance Corporation
 Prince Edward Island Energy Corporation
 Prince Edward Island Grain Elevators Corporation
 Prince Edward Island Liquor Control Commission
 Prince Edward Island Self-Insurance and Risk Management Fund
 Summerside Regional Development Corporation

Quebec
Finances Québec published a list 60 Quebec Crown corporations in June 2017. The following entities were among those listed:

 Agence du Revenu du Québec
 Bibliothèque et Archives nationales du Québec
 Caisse de dépôt et placement du Québec
 Hydro-Québec
Société de développement de la Baie-James — became a full subsidiary of Hydro-Québec in 1978.
 Investissement Québec (merged with the Société générale de financement in 2010)
 Musée d'art contemporain de Montréal
 Musée de la civilisation
 Musée national des beaux-arts du Québec (founded in 1933) — became a société d'État in 1983, and changed back in 2003)
 Régie de l'assurance maladie du Québec
 Société des alcools du Québec (SAQ)
Société québécoise du cannabis (SQDC)
 Société de développement des entreprises culturelles
 Société de la Place des arts de Montréal
 Société de l'assurance automobile du Québec
 Société des casinos du Québec
 Société des établissements de plein air du Québec (Sépaq)
 Société des traversiers du Québec
 Société du Centre des congrès de Québec
 Société du Grand Théâtre de Québec
 Société du Palais des congrès de Montréal
 Télé-Québec
 Loto-Québec

Saskatchewan
Crown Investments Corporation of Saskatchewan (CIC)
eHealth Saskatchewan
Financial and Consumer Affairs Authority
Global Transportation Hub (GTH)
Municipal Financing Corporation of Saskatchewan (MFC)
Saskatchewan Distance Learning Corporation (DLC)
Saskatchewan Government Insurance (SGI)
Saskatchewan Housing Corporation (SHC)
Saskatchewan Liquor and Gaming Authority (SLGA)
Saskatchewan Opportunities Corporation (SOCO)
Saskatchewan Public Safety Agency
Saskatchewan Research Council (SRC)
SaskBuilds
SaskEnergy
SaskGaming
SaskPower
SaskTel
SaskWater
Tourism Saskatchewan
Water Security Agency

Northwest Territories
 Northwest Territories Hydro Corporation
 Northwest Territories Power Corporation
 NWT Business Development and Investment Corporation
 NWT Housing Corporation
 Aurora College

Nunavut
 Qulliq Energy
 Nunavut Arctic College

Yukon
 Yukon Arts Centre
 Yukon Energy
 Yukon Hospital Corporation
 Yukon Liquor Corporation

Former Crown corporations

Several private Canadian companies were once Crown corporations, while others have gone defunct.

See also
 Canada Development Corporation
 Structure of the Canadian federal government
 Nationalization
 Executive Agency
 Statutory corporation, a term used in many Commonwealth countries
State monopoly capitalism
 State-owned enterprise
 State-owned enterprises of the United States
 Crown entity, equivalent bodies in New Zealand

References

 Treasury Board of Canada Secretariat: 2001 Annual Report To Parliament - Crown Corporations and Other Corporate Interests of Canada
 Canadian Heritage Performance Report; March 31, 1998
 Treasury Board of Canada Secretariat: 2007 Annual Report to Parliament - Crown Corporations and other Corporate Interests of Canada

External links
 List of Departments and Agencies of the Government of Canada

 
Monarchy in Canada
Lists of companies of Canada
Canada